

Award winners

Awards by school

Most winners by college

See also
 Miss New York Basketball

References

Mr. and Miss Basketball awards
High school sports in New York (state)
Awards established in 1986
Lists of people from New York (state)
New York (state) sports-related lists